"Tunnel" is a song by Australian rock band The Screaming Jets. The song was released in August 1994 as the fifth and final single from the second studio album Tear of Thought (1992). The song was also included on the extended play Living in England (1992).  The song peaked at number 39 on the ARIA charts.

Track listing
 CD Single 	
 "Tunnel" (Caveman mix) - 3:52
 "Helping Hand" (Live and Sweaty mix) - 4:40
 "Think"  (acoustic) - 5:20
 "Shivers"  (Darwin 100 mix) - 4:57
 "Living in England" (Caveman mix) - 2:16
 "Tunnel" (album edit) - 3:43

Charts

Release history

References

1992 songs
1994 singles
The Screaming Jets songs